The Union of Czech and Slovak Zoological Gardens is an organization for the community of zoos in the Czech Republic and Slovakia. It was founded in 1990 and comprises 19 member zoos.

Members

The organization comprises 15 member zoos in the Czech Republic and 4 in Slovakia.

See also
 List of zoo associations

Notes

External links

Zoo associations
Parks in the Czech Republic
Parks in Slovakia
Czech Republic–Slovakia relations
Animal welfare organizations based in the Czech Republic